The Twin Dilemma is the 63rd volume in the Nancy Drew Mystery Stories series. It was first published by Wanderer Books in 1981 under the author's pseudonym Carolyn Keene. It was written by Nancy Axelrad.

Plot
When a star model disappears, Aunt Eloise insists that Nancy replace the model in a NYC fashion show. Nancy reluctantly accepts the invitation, only to discover that several of the clothes for the show have been stolen! Once on the trail of her elusive enemies, Nancy discovers clue after clue pointing to a diabolical scheme that she must stop at all costs!

References

Nancy Drew books
1981 American novels
Simon & Schuster books
1981 children's books
Novels set in New York City
Children's mystery novels